The European Democratic Alliance was a heterogeneous political group in the European Parliament between 1984 and 1995. It consisted mainly of deputies from the French Gaullist Rally for the Republic (RPR) and the Irish Fianna Fáil. The grouping had a generally centre-right outlook, and strongly defended the European Union's Common Agricultural Policy.

History
Following the 1984 elections, the Group of European Progressive Democrats renamed itself on 24 July 1984 to the Group of the European Democratic Alliance. The European Democratic Alliance merged with the Forza Europa group (dominated by MEPs from Forza Italia) to become the "Group Union for Europe" on 6 July 1995.

Nomenclature
The name of the group in English is Group of the European Democratic Alliance in long form, European Democratic Alliance in short form, and the abbreviation is EDA. The equivalents in French are Groupe du Rassemblement des Démocrates Européens, Rassemblement des Démocrates Européens, and RDE. Those French equivalents are sometimes rendered in English as Union of European Democrats and UED.

Composition

1984–1989

1989–1994

1994–1995

Sources
Europe Politique
European Parliament
European Parliament MEP Archives
Department of Economics, University of California, Berkeley
CVCE (Previously European NAvigator)

References

Former European Parliament party groups
Conservatism in Europe